Haplochromis saxicola is a species of cichlid found in Lake Victoria and may possibly occur in the adjacent reaches of the Nile.  This species reaches a length of  SL.

References

saxicola
Fish described in 1960
Fish of Lake Victoria
Taxa named by Humphry Greenwood
Taxonomy articles created by Polbot